The  was a class of two destroyers of the Imperial Japanese Navy.

Background
Although unable to obtain funding in fiscal year 1907 for additional s, which were expensive due to their large size and imported turbine engines, the Imperial Japanese Navy was also unwilling to purchase three additional  destroyers as recommended by the government. In a compromise, the Navy agreed to purchase two medium size ships instead.

Both were designed and built at the Maizuru Naval Arsenal in Japan.

Design
The Sakura-class ships were half the displacement of the previous Umikaze class but with the same basic hull design. Externally, the design went from four to three smokestacks, which was a first for the Japanese Navy; however, internally the troublesome heavy fuel oil-fired Parsons steam turbine engines of the Umikaze class were replaced by standard coal-fired triple expansion steam engines, which gave better reliability and fuel consumption.

Armament was similar to that of the Umikaze class, with one QF 4.7 inch Gun Mk I - IV, mounted on the forecastle deck forward of the bridge, and four  QF 12 pounder 12 cwt naval guns, mounted one on either side and two towards the stern of the ship, with two twin 450-mm torpedoes launchers.

Operational history
Japan had fifty destroyers operational at the start of World War I. Although intended for coastal operation, with the Umikaze-class destroyers too short in range to operate overseas and with all previous classes of destroyers too small and/or obsolete for front-line service, the two Sakura-class destroyers were Japan's most advanced front-line destroyers during the opening stages of the war. Both were deployed extensively overseas as part of Japan's contribution to the war effort under the terms of the Anglo-Japanese Alliance.

The Sakura-class ships were re-rated as second-class destroyers on 28 August 1912, and served until 1 April 1932 when both were retired.

Ships

References

Notes

Books

External links

Destroyer classes